The American marten (Martes americana), also known as the American pine marten, is a species of North American mammal, a member of the family Mustelidae. The species is sometimes referred to as simply the pine marten. The name "pine marten" is derived from the common name of the distinct Eurasian species, Martes martes.  It is found throughout Canada, Alaska, and parts of the northern United States. It is a long, slender-bodied weasel, with fur ranging from yellowish to brown to near black. It may be confused with the fisher (Pekania pennanti), but the marten is lighter in color and smaller. Identification of the marten is further eased by a characteristic bib that is a distinctly different color than the body. Sexual dimorphism is pronounced, with males being much larger.

The diet is omnivorous and varies by season, but relies chiefly on small mammals like voles. They are solitary except during the mid-summer breeding season. Embryonic implantation is delayed until late winter, however, with a litter of 15 kits born the following spring. Young stay with the mother in a constructed den until the fall and reach sexual maturity by one year old.

Their sable-like fur made them a thoroughly trapped species during the height of the North American fur trade. Trapping peaked in 1820, and populations were depleted until after the turn of the century. Populations have rebounded since, with them being considered a species of least-concern by the IUCN; however, they remain extirpated from some areas of the Northeast, and of the 7 subspecies, one is threatened.

Taxonomy
The Pacific marten (Martes caurina) was formerly thought to be conspecific, but genetic studies support both being distinct species from one another. The Pacific marten has a longer snout and a broader cranium than the American marten.

Seven subspecies have been recognized. None of the subspecies are separable based on morphology and subspecies taxonomy is usually ignored except for conservation issues centered around subspecies rather than ranges.

 M. a. abieticola (Preble)
 M. a. abietinoides (Gray)
 M. a. actuosa (Osgood)
 M. a. americana (Turton)
 M. a. atrata (Bangs)
 M. a. brumalis (Bangs)
 M. a. kenaiensis (Elliot)

A fossil species from the Late Pleistocene to Early Holocene known as Martes nobilis is considered synonymous with the American marten.

Distribution and habitat
The American marten is broadly distributed in northern North America. From north to south its range extends from the northern limit of the treeline in arctic Alaska and Canada south to New York. From east to west, its distribution extends from Newfoundland to western Alaska, and southwest to the Pacific coast of Canada. The American marten's distribution is vast and continuous in Canada and Alaska. In the northeastern and midwestern United States, American marten distribution is limited to mountain ranges that provide preferred habitats. Over time, the distribution of American marten has contracted and expanded regionally, with local extirpations and successful recolonizations occurring in the Great Lakes region and some parts of the Northeast. The American marten has been reintroduced in several areas where extinction occurred, although in some cases it has instead been introduced into the range of the Pacific marten. It is considered extirpated from Pennsylvania, Maryland, Massachusetts, West Virginia, Ohio, New Jersey, and Illinois.

Martens were once thought to live only in old conifer (evergreen) forests but further study shows that martens live in both old and young deciduous (leafy) and conifer forests as well as mixed forests, including in Alaska and Canada, and south into northern New England, and the Adirondacks in New York. Groups of martens also live in the Midwest, in Wisconsin and much of Minnesota. Trapping and destruction of forest habitat have reduced its numbers, but it is still much more abundant than the larger fisher. The Newfoundland subspecies (M. a. atrata) is considered to be threatened.

A broad, natural hybrid zone between the Pacific and American martens is known to exist in the Columbia Mountains, as well as Kupreanof and Kuiu Islands in Alaska. Several translocations of American marten have been made without regard to the Pacific marten, threatening the latter species. On Dall Island, American martens have been introduced and are hybridizing with the native Pacific marten population, which may put them at risk. On many islands throughout the Alexander Archipelago, American martens have been introduced and are present, with no sign of the Pacific martens; it is unknown whether the islands previously had no marten species until American martens were introduced, or whether the Pacific martens existed on those islands previously but were extirpated by the introduced American martens. In addition, genetic evidence of introgression with American martens is present in other parts of the Pacific marten's range, which is likely also a consequence of American marten introductions.

Home range
Compared to other carnivores, the American marten population density is low for their body size. One review reports population densities ranging from 0.4 to 2.5 individuals/km2. Population density may vary annually or seasonally. Low population densities have been associated with a low abundance of prey species.

Home range size of the American marten is extremely variable, with differences attributable to sex, year, geographic area, prey availability, cover type, quality or availability, habitat fragmentation, reproductive status, resident status, predation, and population density. Home range size does not appear to be related to body size for either sex. Home range size ranged from 0.04 sq mi (0.1 km2) in Maine to 6.1 sq mi (15.7 km2) in Minnesota for males, and 0.04 sq mi (0.1 km2) in Maine to 3.0 sq mi (7.7 km2) in Wisconsin for females.

Males generally exhibit larger home ranges than females, which some authors suggest is due to more specific habitat requirements of females (e.g., denning or prey requirements) that limit their ability to shift home range. However, unusually large home ranges were observed for 4 females in two studies (Alaska and Quebec).

Home ranges are indicated by scent-marking. American marten male pelts often show signs of scarring on the head and shoulders, suggesting intrasexual aggression that may be related to home range maintenance. Home range overlap is generally minimal or nonexistent between adult males but may occur between males and females, adult males and juveniles, and between females.

Several authors have reported that home range boundaries appear to coincide with topographical or geographical features. In south-central Alaska, home range boundaries included creeks and a major river. In an area burned 8 years previously in interior Alaska, home range boundaries coincided with transition areas between riparian and nonriparian habitats.

Description
 
The American marten is a long, slender-bodied weasel about the size of a mink with relatively large, rounded ears, short limbs, and a bushy tail. American marten have a roughly triangular head and sharp nose. Their long, silky fur ranges in color from pale yellowish buff to tawny brown to almost black. Their head is usually lighter than the rest of their body, while their tail and legs are darker. American marten usually have a characteristic throat and chest bib ranging in color from pale straw to vivid orange. Sexual dimorphism is pronounced, with males averaging about 15% larger than females in length and as much as 65% larger in body weight.

Total length ranges from 1.5 to 2.2 feet (0.5–0.7 m), with tail length of 5.4 to 6.4 inches (135–160 mm), Adult weight ranges from 1.1 to 3.1 pounds (0.5–1.4 kg) and varies by age and location. Other than size, sexes are similar in appearance. American marten have limited body-fat reserves, experience high mass-specific heat loss, and have limited fasting endurance. In winter, individuals may go into shallow torpor daily to reduce heat loss.

Behavior

American marten activity patterns vary by region, though in general, activity is greater in summer than in winter. American marten may be active as much as 60% of the day in summer but as little as 16% of the day in winter In north-central Ontario individuals were active about 10 to 16 hours a day in all seasons except late winter when activity was reduced to about 5 hours a day. In south-central Alaska, American marten were more active in autumn (66% active) than in late winter and early spring (43% active).

American marten may be nocturnal or diurnal. Variability in daily activity patterns has been linked to activity of major prey species, foraging efficiency, sex, reducing exposure to extreme temperatures, season, and timber harvest. In south-central Alaska, American marten were nocturnal in autumn, with strong individual variability in diel activity in late winter. Activity occurred throughout the day in late winter and early spring.

Daily distance traveled may vary by age, sex, habitat quality, season, prey availability, traveling conditions, weather, and physiological condition of the individual. One marten in south-central Alaska repeatedly traveled 7 to 9 miles (11–14 km) overnight to move between 2 areas of home range focal activity. One individual in central Idaho moved as much as 9 miles (14 km) a day in winter, but movements were largely confined to a 1,280-acre (518 ha) area. Juvenile American marten in east-central Alaska traveled significantly farther each day than adults (1.4 miles (2.2 km) vs. 0.9-mile (1.4 km)).

Weather factors
The weather may impact American marten activity, resting site use, and prey availability. Individuals may become inactive during storms or extreme cold. In interior Alaska, a decrease in above-the-snow activity occurred when ambient temperatures fell below −4F (−20C).

A snowy habitat in many parts of the range of the American marten provides thermal protection and opportunities for foraging and resting. American marten may travel extensively under the snowpack. Subnivean travel routes of >33 feet (10 m) on the Upper Peninsula of Michigan.

American marten are well adapted to snow. On the Kenai Peninsula, individuals navigated through deep snow regardless of depth, with tracks rarely sinking >2 inches (5 cm) into the snowpack. Snowfall patterns may affect distribution, with the presence of American marten linked to deep snow areas.

Where deep snow accumulates, American marten prefer cover types that prevent snow from packing hard and have structures near the ground that provide access to subnivean sites. While American marten select habitats with deep snow, they may concentrate activity in patches with relatively shallow snow.

Reproduction

Breeding
American marten reach sexual maturity by 1 year of age, but effective breeding may not occur before 2 years of age. In captivity, 15-year-old females bred successfully. In the wild, 12-year-old females were reproductive.

Adult American marten are generally solitary except during the breeding season. They are polygamous, and females may have multiple periods of heat. Females enter estrus in July or August, with courtship lasting about 15 days. Embryonic implantation is delayed until late winter, with active gestation lasting approximately two months. Females give birth in late March or April to a litter ranging from 1 to 5 kits. Annual reproductive output is low according to predictions based on body size. Fecundity varies by age and year and may be related to food abundance.

Denning behavior

Females use dens to give birth and to shelter kits. Dens are classified as either natal dens, where parturition takes place, or maternal dens, where females move their kits after birth. American marten females use a variety of structures for natal and maternal denning, including the branches, cavities or broken tops of live trees, snags, stumps, logs, woody debris piles, rock piles, and red squirrel (Tamiasciurus hudsonicus) nests or middens. Females prepare a natal den by lining a cavity with grass, moss, and leaves. They frequently move kits to new maternal dens once kits are 7–13 weeks old. Most females spend more than 50% of their time attending dens in both pre-weaning and weaning periods, with less time spent at dens as kits aged. Paternal care has not been documented.

Development of young
Weaning occurs at 42 days. Young emerge from dens at about 50 days but may be moved by their mother before this. In northwestern Maine, kits were active but poorly coordinated at 7 to 8 weeks, gaining coordination by 12 to 15 weeks. Young reach adult body weight around 3 months.

Kits generally stay in the company of their mother through the end of their first summer, and most disperse in the fall. The timing of juvenile dispersal is not consistent throughout American marten's distribution, ranging from early August to October. In south-central Yukon, young-of-the-year dispersed from mid-July to mid-September, coinciding with the onset of female estrus. Observations from Yukon suggest that juveniles may disperse in early spring.

Food habits
American marten are opportunistic predators, influenced by local and seasonal abundance and availability of potential prey. They require about 80 cal/day while at rest, the equivalent of about 3 voles (Microtus, Myodes, and Phenacomys spp.). Voles dominate diets throughout the American marten's geographic range, though larger prey—particularly snowshoe hares—may be important, particularly in winter. Red-backed voles (Myodes spp.) are generally taken in proportion to their availability, while meadow voles (Microtus''' spp.) are taken in excess of their availability in most areas. Deer mice (Peromyscus maniculatus) and shrews (Soricidae) are generally eaten less than expected, but may be important food items in areas lacking alternative prey species.

American marten diet may shift seasonallySimon, Terri Lee. (1980). An ecological study of the marten in the Tahoe National Forest, California. Sacramento, CA: California State University. Thesis or annually. Generally, diet is more diverse in summer than winter, with summer diets containing more fruit, vegetation, and insects. Diet is generally more diverse with the American marten's distribution compared to Pacific marten's, though there is high diversity in the Pacific states. American marten exhibit the least diet diversity in the subarctic, though diversity may also be low in areas where the diet is dominated by large prey species (e.g., snowshoe hares or red squirrels).

American marten may be important seed dispersers; seeds generally pass through the animal intact, and seeds are likely germinable. One study from Chichagof Island, southeast Alaska, found that Alaska blueberry (Vaccinium alaskensis) and oval leaf huckleberry (V. ovalifolium) seeds had higher germination rates after passing through the gut of American marten compared to seeds that dropped from the parent plant. Analyses of American marten movement and seed passage rates suggested that American marten could disperse seeds long distances: 54% of the distances analyzed were >0.3-mile (0.5 km).

Mortality

Life span
American marten in captivity may live for 15 years. The oldest individual documented in the wild was 14.5 years old. Survival rates vary by geographic region, exposure to trapping, habitat quality, and age. In an unharvested population in northeastern Oregon, the probability of survival of American marten ≥9 months old was 0.55 for 1 year, 0.37 for 2 years, 0.22 for 3 years, and 0.15 for 4 years. The mean annual probability of survival was 0.63 for 4 years. In a harvested population in east-central Alaska, annual adult survival rates ranged from 0.51 to 0.83 over 3 years of study. Juvenile survival rates were lower, ranging from 0.26 to 0.50. In Newfoundland, annual adult survival was 0.83. Survival of juveniles from October to April was 0.76 in a protected population, but 0.51 in areas open to snaring and trapping. In western Quebec, natural mortality rates were higher in clear-cut areas than in unlogged areas.

Predators
American marten are vulnerable to predation from raptors and other carnivores. The threat of predation may be an important factor shaping American marten habitat preferences, a hypothesis inferred from their avoidance of open areas and behavioral observations of the European pine marten (Martes martes). Specific predators vary by geographic region. In Newfoundland, red foxes (Vulpes vulpes) were the most frequent predator, though coyote (Canis latrans) and other American marten were also responsible for some deaths. In deciduous forests in northeastern British Columbia, most predation was attributed to raptors. Throughout the distribution of American marten, other predators include the great horned owl (Bubo virginianus), bald eagle (Haliaeetus leucocephalus), golden eagle (Aquila chrysaetos), bobcat (Lynx rufus) Canada lynx (L. canadensis), mountain lion (Puma concolor), fisher (Pekania pennanti), wolverine (Gulo gulo), grizzly bear (Ursus arctos horribilis), American black bear (U. americanus), and grey wolf (C. lupus).

Hunting
The fur of the American marten is shiny and luxuriant, resembling that of the closely related sable (Martes zibellina''). At the turn of the twentieth century, the American marten population was depleted due to the fur trade. The Hudson's Bay Company traded in pelts from this species among others. Numerous protection measures and reintroduction efforts have allowed the population to increase, but deforestation is still a problem for the marten in much of its habitat. American marten are trapped for their fur in all but a few states and provinces where they occur. The highest annual take in North America was 272,000 animals in 1820.

Trapping is a major source of American marten mortality in some populations and may account for up to 90% of all deaths in some areas. Overharvesting has contributed to local extirpations. Trapping may impact population density, sex ratios and age structure. Juveniles are more vulnerable to trapping than adults, and males are more vulnerable than females. American marten are particularly vulnerable to trapping mortality in industrial forests.

Other
Other sources of mortality include drowning, starvation, exposure, choking, and infections associated with injury. During live trapping, high mortality may occur if individuals become wet in cold weather.

American marten host several internal and external parasites, including helminths, fleas (Siphonaptera), and ticks (Ixodida). American marten in central Ontario carried both toxoplasmosis and Aleutian disease, but neither affliction was suspected to cause significant mortality. High American marten mortality in Newfoundland was caused by encephalitis.

References

Bibliography

External links

 Smithsonian Institution – North American Mammals: Martes americana

Articles containing video clips
Mammals described in 1806
Taxa named by William Turton
Mammals of Canada
Mammals of the United States
Martens